Africa Addio (also known as Africa: Blood and Guts in the United States and  Farewell Africa in the United Kingdom) is a 1966 Italian mondo documentary film co-directed, co-edited and co-written by  Gualtiero Jacopetti and Franco Prosperi with music by Riz Ortolani. Jacopetti and Prosperi had gained fame (along with co-director Paolo Cavara) as the directors of Mondo Cane in 1962.

Africa Addio documents the end of the colonial era in Africa, and the violence and chaos that followed. The film was a huge success, which ensured the viability of the so-called "Mondo film" genre, a cycle of "shockumentaries"- documentaries featuring sensational topics. The film encountered criticism and praise due to its controversial content, but is nevertheless considered to be a very important film in the history of documentary filmmaking.

Vignettes
The narrator (Gualtiero Jacopetti) explains the purpose of the film: to document that Africa has changed forever following decolonization and to show the turmoil in the time immediately following the withdrawal of Europeans from the continent. The narrator states that the film will not tell its audience what to think about these events, but rather that the viewer will have to make up their own minds about what they see.

Somewhere in sub-Saharan Africa, the natives celebrate the British relinquishing control and allowing them to establish their own government. Celebrations start with fireworks but end with mobs of locals destroying imported goods from European countries or African colonies that have not yet gained independence, such as Portugese eggs and South African oranges and beer. 

In Kenya, we see shots of the Mau Mau Uprising. One of the Mau Maus is arrested for the mass murder of an entire family of white farmers and their staff. After the massacre, 100 Mau Maus descended on the farm, tortured the animals and committed cannibalism. The surviving animals are euthanized out of mercy. The organizer of the crimes is sentenced to hard labor for life. 

In the White Highlands area, many white farmers, unwilling to remain without the protection of their governments, sell their farms at a loss and prepare to leave the continent forever. The lawns and gardens of their homes are then bulldozed by the new owners to make way for more farmland. The coffins of dead homeowners are exhumed and are taken by their families to be buried again on another continent. 

Armies of poachers descend on the savanna, now no longer protected as wildlife preserves. Hundreds of animals, including many elephants, are killed for their pelts and ivory. The British still do their best to protect the wildlife, by moving wildlife preserves and giving medical care to injured baby animals who were orphaned by poachers. A poaching operation is stopped by authorities, and they discover that the poachers had used grenades to kill 300 baby elephants. Hundreds of rotting animals, mainly zebras and gazelles, that had been killed and left by poachers must be burned by authorities for health reasons. 

In Zanzibar during its revolution, rebels target Arab civilians as revenge for Sultanate oppression that occurred almost a millennium prior. The camera crew arrives in Zanzibar from Tanganyika and attempts to land, but they are not granted permission. They attempt to land anyway, but are shot at and narrowly manage to take off again and escape. A second plane containing three German journalists is unable to leave, and the plane is burned. 

Between January 18 and 20, 1964, a genocide occurs in Zanzibar, with endless lines of captive Arab civilians are marched at gunpoint to a location where they will be shot by a firing squad. The bodies of countless thousands, some in mass graves and most others strewn across the ground, are photographed from a helicopter. The narrator confirms that this footage is the only documentation to prove that this genocide ever took place. Entire Arab villages march to the sea in a futile attempt to escape the carnage, despite the fact that there is no way off of the island. The filmmakers fly over the beach again the following day and find the bodies of all the villagers who tried to get to the ocean. The genocide claimed the lives of approximately 5,000 Arab and South Asian civilians (estimates range up to 20,000 in the aftermath). 

At Fort São Sebastião, one of the fortresses on the Ilha de Moçambique built by Vasco de Gama along the coast of Mozambique, Portuguese soldiers attend a Catholic Mass and receive the Eucharist while guerilla rebels on the mainland travel hesitantly through the morning fog. In Angola during the  Angolan War of Independence, Portuguese soldiers lay traps for the rebel guerillas in the forest. The narrator bitterly laments that the Portuguese have consistently tried to integrate black Africans into society, while the Portuguese settlers were hated and shunned in return. 

In the middle of the Bugesera invasion in Rwanda during January of 1964, the Watusi are pursued by the Bantu rebels after anti-Watusi propaganda was pushed by the Chinese for political purposes. In two months, the Bantu massacre 18,000 Watussi. On the banks of the Kagera River, 54 amputated hands are found by authorities near a tree that was used as a makeshift chopping block. 25 Bantu guerillas are arrested for the heinous crime. The waters of the Kwoni send the corpses downstream, and for days fishermen work to remove the bodies so their drinking water isn’t contaminated. The bodies are moved onto the beach and burned in a mass grave. Thousands of refugees attempt to flee to Uganda. 

At dawn on February 25, 1964 in Uganda, “operation cropping” begins after the British leave once more and the African government declares that the national parks will be for hunting. Countless animals, formerly protected, are hunted for their meat. On March 25, 1964 at Murchison Falls national park, elephants are hunted.

On April 3, 1964 at Queen Elizabeth National Park, hippopotamus are hunted and hundreds of hippo skulls are shown covering a beach. In an attempt to stop the spread of buzzards, the rotting corpses are destroyed with grenades. 

In Bagamoyo, Tanganyika, so many Arabs are killed that the morgues overflow with corpses and the bodies have to be laid on the street. In Dar es Salaam, president Nyere has gone into hiding because mutinous army troops have taken over the city. Crowds block the bodies of slaughtered Arabs from the camera. Arab shops and houses are destroyed by rioting civilians and Arabs are lined up against a wall and shot. An Arab attempting to flee into the sea is drowned by a mob. Soon after, the filmmakers are dragged out of their car violently, with the soldiers preparing to shoot them, but when the soldiers see the filmmakers’ Italian passports, they are released because they “aren’t whites, they’re Italians”.

On June 26 1964, during the civil war in Congo, formerly exiled president of the secessionist State of Katanga, Moïse Tshombe, returns to Léopoldville and promises to fix the political situation in the Congo by leading the Simba rebellion. Rebel forces armed with bows and believing that a magic spell makes them invulnerable to enemy bullets, goes into battle against the Belgians while high on drugs and is massacred. 

On November 24, 1964, five months after Tshombe took over Stanleyville, during Operation Dragon Rouge, 320 Belgian paratroopers retake the city in ten minutes, resulting in seven thousand rebels fleeing before they can continue their massacres. The paratroopers and white mercenaries force the rebels to bury the victims of a massacre which resulted in 12,000 black enemies of the revolution being tortured, killed and eaten, 80 children being burned alive, 74 whites killed, and four white nurses raped. In addition, nine nuns, seven missionaries and four white children were tied together and shot in the mouths and their livers eaten. Thousands of white civilians are rescued by the Belgians and mercenaries that were transported on American planes, and the African governments accuse the Americans of unlawfully interfering in their affairs. 

At a Catholic mission northeast of Stanleyville, on the border of Congo and Sudan, more than 100 nuns, priests and children are held by a band of rebels who control the Ituri Rainforest. They promise to kill their hostages if a rescue attempt is made, and even though the government does not attempt rescue, the entire mission is massacred anyway. 

On October 22, 1964, Rhodesian troops and mercenaries attack Boende and liberate a convent from rebels who were attempting to kill everyone there. A Simba rebel who burned 27 children alive is summarily executed by firing squad. Soon after, Tshombe returns to exile. 

Finally, in South Africa, Apartheid is documented. The film ends with the narrator describing the African penguin on the Cape of Good Hope, and how they ended up stranded in Africa when the chunk of ice they were on melted. Now strangers in a strange land, these penguins simply try to survive the violent waters as the dark continent grows hotter and more hostile towards them.

Production

Filming

The film was shot over the course of three years across most of sub-Saharan Africa. Most notably, the film features footage from the Congo, Tanganyika, Zanzibar, Angola, Kenya and South Africa. The documentary also includes some behind-the-scenes footage from the 1964 film Zulu. Production was done on 35mm, a rarity for documentaries, which were almost always shot on 16mm at the time. Even more unique was the filmmakers' use of 2-perf Techniscope film. This gave the film a wide 2.35:1 aspect ratio despite using standard spherical lenses. Most documentaries were usually seen in the standard 1.33:1 aspect ratio, so a documentary being filmed on such a wide aspect ratio is something that wasn't seen for decades.

The filmmakers were in near-constant danger for most of filming, with Tanganyika and Zanzibar being especially dangerous. In Zanzibar, their planes were shot at and they witnessed rebels lighting a plane crewed by Germans on fire and capturing the people inside. In Dar es Salaam, they were almost shot for photographing a genocide. Jacopetti suffered a cut after a soldier smashed their vehicle's windshield with the butt of his rifle. However, the soldiers let them go because they saw on their passports that they were Italian, and thus, "not whites." Jacopetti would refer to this as "a miracle."

Soundtrack
A soundtrack of the music used in the film was later released. The composer was Riz Ortolani (who had scored Mondo Cane that featured the tune later used for the hit single More). When making Africa Addio, lyrics were added to Ortolani's title theme, making a song called "Who Can Say?" that was sung by Jimmy Roselli. The song did not appear in the film, but (unlike the successful song More spawned by Mondo Cane) did appear on the United Artists Records soundtrack album.

Post-production
Prior to the film's release, allegations arose that a scene depicting the execution of a Congolese Simba Rebel was actually a murder done for the cameras. This resulted in co-director Gualtiero Jacopetti being arrested on charges of snuff filming. The film's footage was seized by police, and the editing process was halted during the legal proceedings. He was acquitted after he and co-director Franco Prosperi produced documents proving they had arrived at the scene just before the execution took place.

A tie-in book with the same title, written by John Cohen, was released by Ballantine to coincide with the film's release.

Release

Different versions
Various cuts of the film have appeared over the years. The Italian and French versions were edited and were provided with narration by Jacopetti himself. The American version, with the explicitly shocking title Africa: Blood and Guts, was re-released in 1970 by Jerry Gross' company Cinemation Industries and had 40 minutes cut out, mainly traces of political context, and was edited and translated without the approval of Jacopetti. Indeed, the differences are such that Jacopetti has called this film “a betrayal of the original idea”. Notable differences are thus present between the Italian and English-language versions in terms of the text of the film. Many advocates of the film feel that it has unfairly maligned the original intentions of the filmmakers. For example, the subtitled translation of the opening crawl in the Italian version reads:
"The Africa of the great explorers, the huge land of hunting and adventure adored by entire generations of children, has disappeared forever. To that age-old Africa, swept away and destroyed by the tremendous speed of progress, we have said farewell. The devastation, the slaughter, the massacres which we assisted belong to a new Africa – one which if it emerges from its ruins to be more modern, more rational, more functional, more conscious – will be unrecognizable.
"On the other hand, the world is racing toward better times. The new America rose from the ashes of a few white man, all the redskins, and the bones of millions of buffalo. The new, carved up Africa will rise again upon the tombs of a few white men, millions of black men, and upon the immense graveyards that were once its game reserves. The endeavor is so modern and recent that there is no room to discuss it at the moral level. The purpose of this film is only to bid farewell to the old Africa that is dying and entrust to history the documentation of its agony"

The English version:
"The old Africa has disappeared. Untouched Jungles, huge herds of game, high adventure, the happy hunting ground – those are the dreams of the past. Today there is a new Africa - modern and ambitious. The old Africa died amidst the massacres and devastations we filmed. But revolutions, even for the better, are seldom pretty. America was built over the bones of thousands of pioneers and revolutionary soldiers, hundreds of thousands of Indians, and millions of Bison. The new Africa emerges over the graves of thousands of whites and Arabs, and millions of blacks, and over the bleak boneyards that once were the game reserves.
"What the camera sees, it films pitilessly, without sympathy, without taking sides. Judging is for you to do, later. This film only says farewell to the old Africa, and gives to the world the pictures of its agony."

IMDb lists the total runtime as 140 minutes, and a 'complete' version on YouTube runs closest to that at 138 minutes, 23 seconds. This is an Italian language version, with a clear soundtrack and legible English subtitling. IMDb lists the different runtimes for previously released versions: USA- 122'; Norway- 124'; and Sweden- 116'.

Reception and legacy

Praise
Praise was usually directed at the film's music and visuals, as well as the courage of the filmmakers to deliver such unique and risky footage to the world, especially of massacres that would have been covered up. Africa Addio features the only known combat footage of the Congo Mercenaries, and the only known visual evidence of the Arab genocide during the Zanzibar Revolution. In Italy, it won the 1966 David di Donatello award for producer Angelo Rizzoli. Some conservative publications, such as Italy's Il Tempo, praised the film. In 1968 at the Carnival of Viareggio, a float inspired by the film took part and made by the master of papier-mâché Il Barzella. Some items from this float, along with other memorabilia including a copy of the book by John Cohen, are kept in Museum of Dizionario del Turismo Cinematografico in Verolengo.

Many commentators, however, accused it of racism and misrepresentation. Jacopetti and Prosperi responded to criticism of the film by defending their intentions. In the 2003 documentary The Godfathers of Mondo, Prosperi argues that the criticism was due to the fact that, "The public was not ready for this kind of truth," and Jacopetti explicitly states that the film “was not a justification of colonialism, but a condemnation for leaving the continent in a miserable condition.” The subsequent film collaboration between the two men, Addio Zio Tom, explored the horrors of American racial slavery and was intended (in part) to combat the charges of racism leveled against them following the release of Africa Addio (though that, too, was criticized for perceived racism).

Criticism
Film directors Octavio Getino and Fernando Solanas harshly criticized the film in their manifesto Toward a Third Cinema, calling Jacopetti a fascist, and asserting that in the film, man is "viewed as a beast," and is "turned into an extra who dies so Jacopetti can comfortably film his execution." 

Film critic Roger Ebert, in a scathing 1967 review of the shortened American version of the film, called it "racist" and stated that it "slanders a continent." He drew attention to the opening narration:

"Europe has abandoned her baby," the narrator mourns, "just when it needs her the most." Who has taken over, now that the colonialists have left? The advertising spells it out for us: "Raw, wild, brutal, modern-day savages!"

US Ambassador to the United Nations Arthur Goldberg condemned the film as "grossly distorted" and "socially irresponsible," noting the protests of five African UN delegates. In West Germany, a protest movement against the film emerged after Africa Addio was awarded by the state-controlled movie rating board. The protest was chiefly organized by the Socialist German Student Union (SDS) and groups of African students. In West Berlin, the distributor resigned from showing the film after a series of demonstrations and damage to cinemas.

Staging allegations
Despite the filmmakers vehemently denying that anything in the film was staged, widespread rumors still claim that various scenes are inauthentic for entertainment purposes. Jacopetti has repeatedly stated that all images in the film are real and that nothing was ever staged. In the documentary The Godfathers of Mondo, Jacopetti and Prosperi stressed that the only scenes they ever staged were in Mondo Cane 2. In the same documentary, Prosperi described their filmmaking philosophy: “Slip in, ask, never pay, never reenact.”

References

Bibliography
 Stefano Loparco, 'Gualtiero Jacopetti - Graffi sul mondo', Il Foglio Letterario, 2014 -  (The book contains unpublished documents and the testimonies of Carlo Gregoretti, Franco Prosperi, Riz Ortolani, Katyna Ranieri, Giampaolo Lomi, Pietro Cavara e Gigi Oliviero).

External links

 
 
 
 Africa Addio online at Internet Archive

1966 films
Films directed by Gualtiero Jacopetti
Films shot in Angola
Italian documentary films
Mondo films
Documentary films about African resistance to colonialism
1966 documentary films
Documentary films about Africa
Films scored by Riz Ortolani
Films produced by Angelo Rizzoli
Films shot in the Democratic Republic of the Congo
Films shot in Tanzania
Films shot in Kenya
Films shot in South Africa
1960s Italian-language films
1960s Italian films